Heuristic Park, Inc. is an American video game development company founded in 1995 by David W. Bradley. The company is based in Atlanta, Georgia and was founded after Bradley left Sir-Tech.

Games 
Wizards & Warriors - 2000
Dungeon Lords - 2005
Dungeon Lords: The Orb and the Oracle - Cancelled
Dungeon Lords MMXII - 2012

References

External links 
 Heuristic Park company profile from MobyGames

Companies based in Atlanta
Companies established in 1995
Video game companies of the United States
Video game development companies